Novotroitsky is a rural locality (a settlement) in Alexandrovskoye Rural Settlement, Talovsky District, Voronezh Oblast, Russia. The population was 703 as of 2010. There are 6 streets.

Geography 
Novotroitsky is located 11 km north of Talovaya (the district's administrative centre) by road. Sergiyevsky is the nearest rural locality.

References 

Rural localities in Talovsky District